The Minister of Bantu Administration and Development, and Bantu Education is a former political position in apartheid South Africa. Until 1958, the position was titled The Minister of Native Affairs.

Office-holders

Government ministers of South Africa